Adjei Mensah (born 24 February 1970) is a Ghanaian politician who was a member of the 6th parliament of the 4th Republic of Ghana. He served as a Member of the Parliament of Ghana Techiman South constituency in the Brong-Ahafo Region of Ghana.

Early life and education 
Adjei Mensah was born on 24 February 1970 in Krobo – Techiman in the Brong Ahafo region. He has a Bachelor of Arts degree in Social Work and Political Science from the University of Ghana in 2002.

Career 
Mensah is an Educationist. He was the Assistant Director II at GES. He was also a Basic School Coordinator of the Municipal Office of the GES. He was also the Presiding Member of Techiman Municipal Assembly from April 2009 - January 2013.

Politics 
Mensah is a member of National Democratic Congress. He served as a member of parliament for Techiman South Constituency in the then Brong Ahafo Region from 2013 to 2017.

Personal life 
Mensah is married with three children. He is a Christian.

References 

Living people
1970 births
People from Brong-Ahafo Region
Ghanaian MPs 2013–2017
University of Ghana alumni
Ghanaian educators
National Democratic Congress (Ghana) politicians